Denis Perrior Hunt (8 September 1937 – 29 January 2019) was an English professional footballer who made over 320 appearances as a left back in the Football League for Gillingham between 1958 and 1968. He became player-manager of Folkestone in 1969 and later managed Ashford Town and Margate.

Personal life 
Hunt grew up in a football family and was the brother of Ralph Hunt and the nephew of Douglas Hunt. Prior to becoming a professional footballer, Hunt served in the British Army and after leaving football, he ran a newsagent's in Folkestone.

Honours

As a player 
Gillingham
 Football League Fourth Division: 1963–64

As a manager 
Margate
 Southern League First Division South: 1977–78
 Southern League Merit Cup: 1977–78

Career statistics

References

1937 births
2019 deaths
English footballers
English football managers
Gillingham F.C. players
Brentford F.C. players
Margate F.C. managers
Footballers from Portsmouth
Folkestone F.C. players
Association football utility players
Southern Football League managers
Southern Football League players
Folkestone F.C. managers
Ashford United F.C. managers
British Army soldiers
Association football fullbacks